Bruce Phillips may refer to:
 Bruce Phillips (footballer), Australian rules footballer
 Bruce Phillips (journalist), Canadian television journalist
 Utah Phillips (Bruce Duncan Phillips]], American labor organizer, folk singer, storyteller and poet